Future Cop: LAPD is a third-person shooter developed by EA Redwood Shores and published by Electronic Arts and released first for the PlayStation, then Mac OS and Microsoft Windows. Future Cop was originally developed as an installment of the Strike series.

In the game, players assume the role of a pilot for the X1-Alpha, a robot designed to fight in the "Crime War" in Los Angeles in the year 2098. The X1-Alpha is a police vehicle that can transform between a fast, hovering pursuit vehicle, and a slower, full-fledged combat mecha.

Gameplay
There are two modes of play in the game, Crime War and Precinct Assault (both modes can be played either as single player or two player). Precinct Assault is a strategy mode that is similar to Herzog Zwei (except the player can actively help their armies get to the other base) and is well known for inspiring MOBA games like DotA and League of Legends.

Crime War Mode
Crime War is a story mode, following a day in the life of an LAPD X1-Alpha pilot. The story events range from rogue lunatics arming observatories with weapons, to a malfunctioning supercomputer. Players begin in a futuristic Griffith Park, but as they advance through the game they may unlock areas such as Venice Beach, LAX and Long Beach. Crime War also supports a second player in cooperative play. Cooperative play features the unique feature that the life bars of the two players are intertwined; if either player is destroyed, it counts as a failure for both players.

Precinct Assault Mode
Cited as an early MOBA game, Precinct Assault is an arena battle mode in which each player starts with a single base and can capture automated Turrets or Outposts across the map. The objective is to defeat one's opponent by purchasing and deploying Hovertanks to invade their main base. The game ends when one player's base is breached by either a standard or super-sized "Dreadnought" Hovertank. Players may also deploy defensive Helicopters or the "Flying Fortress" Superplane to assist in securing their perimeter, shooting down enemy tanks that come near the base. Single-player mode consists of fighting a computer opponent named "Sky Captain", whose in-game avatar is a Superplane, more powerful and advanced than the X1-Alpha. Two player mode is a competitive battle between two X1-Alpha robots. There are five different precinct assault areas with 10 difficulty settings (for single player); however the level "La Cantina" was not on the original PlayStation release, only being added later for the computer versions. There is also a bonus area, known as 'Bug Hunt', which is the same as the 'Proving Ground' level, except all objects have been made into creatures such as worms and butterflies, instead of Hovertanks and Helicopters. The Flying Fortress is now a bat, and the Dreadnought is a large, armored caterpillar. The level features an up-beat music track in comparison to the game's normal dark military music and "Sky Captain" is a dragonfly.

The PC version also allowed for online competitive play, technically making Future Cop: LAPD the first MOBA game ever released.

Reception

The game received favorable reviews on both platforms, according to the review aggregation website GameRankings. In Japan, where the PlayStation version was ported and published by Electronic Arts Victor under the name  on August 5, 1999, Famitsu gave it a score of 29 out of 40.

AllGame gave the PlayStation version four stars out of five, saying, "Fun? You bet! The bottom line is that Future Cop is the ticket for fans of the Strike series and those longing for a third person shooter with personality."

The Macintosh version was nominated for Best Macintosh Game at the 1998 CNET Gamecenter Awards, which went to Unreal.

The game reportedly sold only 200,000 units, after which members of the studio split and moved to other studios.

Notes

References

External links
 

1998 video games
Cooperative video games
Electronic Arts games
Classic Mac OS games
Video games about mecha
Multiplayer online games
PlayStation (console) games
PlayStation Network games
Third-person shooters
Video games about police officers
Video games adapted into comics
Video games set in California
Video games set in Los Angeles
Video games set in the 2090s
Windows games
Cyberpunk video games
Science fiction video games
Video games developed in the United States